SBR Odds is an odds review site and tool, which is used by bettors to compare betting odds. The site is also used as a forum and information source for sports odds. The site has featured in printed and digital media, referring mainly to their picks and betting odds. SBR Odds is a subsidiary website of Sportsbookreview.com.

The website has been discussed in the Seattle Times, San Francisco Gate and the Huffington Post.

Company

The SBR Odds website is closely linked to the SBR Forum and also Sportsbookreview.com. It offers a live comparison for various sports for a number of leading bookmakers. The website provides users with SBR Points, which act as reward points for bettors who use the site.

The website is used by a number of gambling websites to incorporate live odds into their website through a RSS Feed. As an example of this, The Sports Lifestyle uses this system to display an NHL Scoreboard throughout their website. The websites odds and picks regularly referred to online. The websites picks and odds have featured in the Seattle Times, Huffington Post, and the Bleacher Report.

SBR Odds are also known within the betting industry as a credible resource website.

Mechanics

The SBR websites main feature is its live betting tool. The SBR Odds betting tool provides bettors with live odds across 32 different sportsbooks. The tool also allows bettors to view the history of line movements, which is said to be helpful for professional bettors.

The betting tool has a number of features that aid each bettor when comparing odds between different sportsbooks. Any changes to the odds are colour coded, which allows the bettor to compare sportsbooks against each other. Betting movement is essential to any professional bettor, giving them the option to view where money is being placed from the line opening is seen as one of the major components. Bettors can also view archived bets from the same day.

Reception

The SBR Odds tool has been likened to professional stock monitoring tools. It has also said to be one of the industry replacements for rudimentary odd comparison techniques.

References

Gambling websites